60 (sixty) is the natural number following 59 and preceding 61. Being three times 20, it is called threescore in older literature (kopa in Slavic, Schock in Germanic).

In mathematics
 60 is a highly composite number. Because it is the sum of its unitary divisors (excluding itself), it is a unitary perfect number, and it is an abundant number with an abundance of 48. Being ten times a perfect number, it is a semiperfect number.
 It is the smallest number divisible by the numbers 1 to 6: there is no smaller number divisible by the numbers 1 to 5 since any number divisible by 2 and 3 must also be divisible by 6.
 It is the smallest number with exactly 12 divisors.
 It is one of seven integers that have more divisors than any number less than twice itself , one of six that are also lowest common multiple of a consecutive set of integers from 1, and one of six that are divisors of every highly composite number higher than itself.
 It is the smallest number that is the sum of two odd primes in six ways.
 The smallest nonsolvable group (A5) has order 60.

 There are four Archimedean solids with 60 vertices: the truncated icosahedron, the rhombicosidodecahedron, the snub dodecahedron, and the truncated dodecahedron.  The skeletons of these polyhedra form 60-node vertex-transitive graphs.  There are also two Archimedean solids with 60 edges: the snub cube and the icosidodecahedron.  The skeleton of the icosidodecahedron forms a 60-edge symmetric graph.
 There are 60 one-sided hexominoes, the polyominoes made from six squares.
 In geometry, it is the number of seconds in a minute, and the number of minutes in a degree.
 In normal space, the three interior angles of an equilateral triangle each measure 60 degrees, adding up to 180 degrees.
 Because it is divisible by the sum of its digits in decimal, it is a Harshad number.
 A number system with base 60 is called sexagesimal (the original meaning of sexagesimal is sixtieth).
 It is the smallest positive integer that is written with only the smallest and the largest digit of base 2 (binary), base 3 (ternary), and base 4 (quaternary).
 60 is also the product of the side lengths of the smallest whole number right triangle: 3, 4, 5, a type of Pythagorean triple.

In science and technology

The first fullerene to be discovered was buckminsterfullerene C60, an allotrope of carbon with 60 atoms in each molecule, arranged in a truncated icosahedron. This ball is known as a buckyball, and looks like a soccer ball.

The atomic number of neodymium is 60, and cobalt-60 (60Co) is a radioactive isotope of cobalt.

The electrical utility frequency in western Japan, South Korea, Taiwan, the Philippines, the United States, and several other countries in the Americas is 60 Hz.

An exbibyte (sometimes called exabyte) is 260 bytes.

Cultural number systems

The Babylonian cuneiform numerals had a base of 60, inherited from the Sumerian and Akkadian civilizations, and possibly motivated by the large number of divisors that 60 has.  The sexagesimal measurement of time and of geometric angles is a legacy of the Babylonian system.

The number system in the Mali Empire was based on 60, reflected in the counting system of the Maasina Fulfulde, a variant of the Fula language spoken in contemporary Mali. The Ekagi of Western New Guinea used base 60, and the sexagenary cycle plays a role in Chinese calendar and numerology.

This quantity was used in international medieval treaties e.g. for ransom of captured Teutonic Knights.

In religion
60 occurs several times in the Bible; for example, as the age of Isaac when Jacob and Esau were born, and the number of warriors escorting King Solomon.

In the laws of kashrut of Judaism, 60 is the proportion (60:1) of kosher to non-kosher ingredients that can render an admixture kosher post-facto.

In the Quran, 60 is mentioned once: "..he should feed sixty indigent ones..", but it is mentioned many times in the Hadith, most notably Muhammad being reported to say, "..Allah, the Exalted and Glorious, created Adam in His own image with His length of sixty cubits.."

In Hinduism, the 60th birthday of a man is called Sashti poorthi. A ceremony called Sashti (60) Abda (years) Poorthi (completed) in Sanskrit is conducted to felicitate this birthday. It represents a milestone in his life. There are 60 years mentioned in the historic Indian calendars.

In other fields

It is:
 In time, the number of seconds in a minute, and the number of minutes in an hour. (a legacy of the Babylonian number system)
 The number of feet in the standard measurement tool to evaluate an automotive launch on a dragstrip, as the time taken to travel the first  of the track.
 The number of miles per hour an automobile accelerates to from rest (0-60) as one of the standard measurements of performance
 The number of years in a sexagenary cycle
 60 Minutes, a CBS investigative television show
 Sixty Minute Man was a TV show starring Kenny Baumann
 A common speed limit, in miles per hour, for freeways in many U.S. states
 A common speed limit, in kilometers per hour, in urban areas in Russia
 In years of marriage, the diamond wedding anniversary
 The maximum number of marbles (game pieces) in Chinese checkers
 The code for international direct dial calls to Malaysia
 The highest attainable level in World of Warcraft (not including the five latest expansions)
 Studio 60 on the Sunset Strip was a TV show on NBC (2006–07)
 Gone in 60 Seconds is a movie starring Nicolas Cage
 Miss Sixty is a women's apparel brand
 The number of cards in the game Rack-O
 The number of the French department Oise
 Alpha 60 is a brain-computer in the movie Alphaville directed by Jean-Luc Godard
 The age for senior citizens in some cultures

In sports
 In darts, 60 (treble-twenty) is the highest score that can be achieved with a single dart.
 New York Yankees Babe Ruth hit 60 home runs in 1927 during a 154-game season; although the record has been broken three times since then, by Roger Maris, Mark McGwire, and Barry Bonds (with Sammy Sosa and Aaron Judge also exceeding that total), those records were set during a 162-game season.
 In NCAA Division II, each member school may provide athletically-related financial aid in men's sports amounting to no more than the equivalent of 60 full scholarships. Basketball and football are excluded from this limit by rule.
 The total number of minutes in an ice hockey game, divided into three periods.
 The total number of minutes in a gridiron football game, divided into four quarters.

See also 
 List of highways numbered 60

References

External links

 

Integers